Microflata is a genus of planthoppers in the family Flatidae, established by Leopold Melichar in 1902. It contains only one species, Microflata stictica.

References 

Flatidae
Monotypic Hemiptera genera